Trisodium citrate has the chemical formula of Na3C6H5O7. It is sometimes referred to simply as "sodium citrate", though sodium citrate can refer to any of the three sodium salts of citric acid. It possesses a saline, mildly tart flavor, and is a mild alkali.

Applications

Foods
Sodium citrate is chiefly used as a food additive, usually for flavor or as a preservative. Its E number is E331. Sodium citrate is employed as a flavoring agent in certain varieties of club soda. It is common as an ingredient in bratwurst, and is also used in commercial ready-to-drink beverages and drink mixes, contributing a tart flavor. It is found in gelatin mix, ice cream, yogurt, jams, sweets, milk powder, processed cheeses, carbonated beverages, and wine, amongst others.

Sodium citrate can be used as an emulsifying stabilizer when making cheese. It allows the cheese to melt without becoming greasy by stopping the fats from separating.

Buffering

As a conjugate base of a weak acid, citrate can perform as a buffering agent or acidity regulator, resisting changes in pH. It is used to control acidity in some substances, such as gelatin desserts. It can be found in the milk minicontainers used with coffee machines. The compound is the product of antacids, such as Alka-Seltzer, when they are dissolved in water. The pH of a solution of 5 g/100 ml water at 25 °C is 7.5 – 9.0. It is added to many commercially packaged dairy products to control the pH impact of the gastrointestinal system of humans, mainly in processed products such as cheese and yogurt, although it also has beneficial effects on the physical gel microstructure.

Chemistry
Sodium citrate is a component in Benedict's qualitative solution, often used in organic analysis to detect the presence of reducing sugars such as glucose.

Medicine
In 1914, the Belgian doctor Albert Hustin and the Argentine physician and researcher Luis Agote successfully used sodium citrate as an anticoagulant in blood transfusions, with Richard Lewisohn determining its correct concentration in 1915. It continues to be used today in blood-collection tubes and for the preservation of blood in blood banks. The citrate ion chelates calcium ions in the blood by forming calcium citrate complexes, disrupting the blood clotting mechanism. Recently, trisodium citrate has also been used as a locking agent in vascath and haemodialysis lines instead of heparin due to its lower risk of systemic anticoagulation.

In 2003, Ööpik et al. showed the use of sodium citrate (0.5 g/kg body weight) improved running performance over 5 km by 30 seconds.

Sodium citrate is used to relieve discomfort in urinary-tract infections, such as cystitis, to reduce the acidosis seen in distal renal tubular acidosis, and can also be used as an osmotic laxative. It is a major component of the WHO oral rehydration solution.

It is used as an antacid, especially prior to anaesthesia, for caesarian section procedures to reduce the risks associated with the aspiration of gastric contents.

Boiler descaling
Sodium citrate is a particularly effective agent for removal of carbonate scale from boilers without removing them from operation and for cleaning automobile radiators.

See also
 Monosodium citrate
 Disodium citrate
 Citric acid

References

Food acidity regulators
Citrates
Organic sodium salts
Chelating agents
E-number additives